Chauki Maddi (18 July 1929 – 26 September 2018), better known by his stage name as Tito Madi, was a Brazilian singer and composer. He wrote the songs  "Cansei de Ilusões", "Sonho e Saudade" and  "Carinho e Amor".

References

1929 births
2018 deaths
Musicians from Rio de Janeiro (city)
20th-century Brazilian male singers
20th-century Brazilian singers
Brazilian male composers